Tuniscope is a community web portal based in Tunis, focusing on the news and culture of Tunisia. The site is operated by the Tunisian company Eolia. The managing editor is  Khaled Aouij; the editors are Amal Jerbi  and Abir Fares.

According to Google Trends, in April 2011 the site had on average 10,000 daily unique visitors

In 2010, the site was awarded a WSA-mobile World Summit Award by the World Summit on the Information Society, for Outstanding Regional Achievement in Media and News.

References

External links
tuniscope.com

Tunisian news websites
French-language websites
Arabic-language websites
French-language mass media in Tunisia
Arabic-language mass media in Tunisia